Lizelia is an unincorporated community in Lauderdale County, Mississippi, United States. Lizelia is located on Ponta Creek and is the former site of old Daleville. A post office operated under the name Lizelia from 1886 to 1911.

Notes

Unincorporated communities in Lauderdale County, Mississippi
Unincorporated communities in Mississippi